Korvatunturi is a fell in Lapland, on the border between Finland and Russia. Its Finnish part is within Urho Kekkonen National Park in the municipality of Savukoski. In Finnish the name Korvatunturi means "Ear Fell", referring to the mountain's distinctive profile.

Korvatunturi is covered by a thick pine forest, and surrounded by frozen lakes, and sits on a landscape over which hundreds of thousands of reindeer roam. Since Korvatunturi straddles the border of the country, all visitors are required to obtain written permission from the Finnish Border Guard. There are also no roads that directly lead to the fell, but there are hike trails that provide access, such as the one found in the Savukoski area.

Cultural significance 

Korvatunturi is best known as the home of the legendary character Father Christmas (or Joulupukki in Finnish, Julgubben in Finland Swedish). According to Finnish folklore, this land is said to be the location of Father Christmas’ secret workshop, where toys, trinkets and gifts are said to be made and eventually wrapped by elves. Known for their good-natured demeanour and their role as guardians of homes, these elves are also said to be responsible for analysing weather patterns for the yearly gift-giving trip around the world.

People have also claimed that the ear-shaped structure of the fell supposedly allows Father Christmas to hear the wishes of every child on Earth.

For letter mail to Father Christmas Korvatunturi has postal code 99999 Korvatunturi, even though all post sent to this address will actually be carried to Santa Claus Village at Rovaniemi.

In popular media, this legend has been adapted into the film Rare Exports: A Christmas Tale.

See also 

 Christmas in Finland

References

External links 
 Visit Savukoski: Korvatunturi

Mountains of Finland
Santa Claus
Savukoski
Mountains of Russia
International mountains of Europe
Finland–Russia border
Landforms of Lapland (Finland)
Christmas traditions
Landforms of the Republic of Karelia